"A Night in Tunisia" is a musical composition written by Dizzy Gillespie.

A Night in Tunisia may also refer to:

A Night in Tunisia (1957 album), by Art Blakey & the Jazz Messengers 
A Night in Tunisia (1961 album), by Art Blakey & the Jazz Messengers
Night in Tunisia (1976 short story collection) by Neil Jordan
Night in Tunisia: Digital Recording, 1979, by Art Blakey & the Jazz Messengers
A Night in Tunisia (Art Pepper album), recorded in 1977 and released in 1983